The Snatch Game is a challenge on the Drag Race reality competition television franchise. Beginning with the second season of the original American series RuPaul's Drag Race, the challenge has taken place on every season since. It has also occurred on RuPaul's Drag Race All Stars since season 2, both seasons of RuPaul's Secret Celebrity Drag Race, and on the Thai, British, Canadian, Dutch, Australian-New Zealand, Spanish, Italian, French, and Filipino international installments. The Snatch Game typically parodies the game show Match Game (known as Blankety Blank in the UK and  Blankety Blanks in Australia) and is a test of the contestants' skills at celebrity impersonation and improvisational comedy.

Usually occurring about halfway through each Drag Race season, Snatch Game is commonly perceived as one of the most important and memorable challenges of the show and, in RuPaul's own words, separates "the basic bitches from the fierce-ass queens." Winners of the show are often amongst the top performers in the Snatch Game, though there are a few exceptions.

Because they are drag queens, the show's contestants typically impersonate women, although there have been several instances of contestants choosing male celebrities whose public images were sufficiently flamboyant to fit in with a drag aesthetic. Several contestants have chosen to impersonate other people directly associated with the show, such as other past or present contestants, Michelle Visage, or RuPaul. Queens cannot choose copyrighted characters, although some have ostensibly impersonated actors while actually basing their portrayal on one of the celebrity's film or television performances.

The challenge often brings in celebrity guests who serve as answer providers and sometimes, but not always, also serve as the guest judges of the episode. However, some seasons have also used members of the show's regular judging panel, such as Michelle Visage, Ross Mathews, Carson Kressley or Rhys Nicholson, in lieu of outside guests.

Five queens have won the Snatch Game more than once: BenDeLaCreme, Ginger Minj, Baga Chipz, Jinkx Monsoon, and Trinity the Tuck. One queen, Gia Gunn, has been eliminated more than once for her Snatch Game performances.

United States
Legend:

RuPaul's Drag Race

RuPaul's Drag Race All Stars

RuPaul's Secret Celebrity Drag Race

International
Legend:

Canada's Drag Race

Canada's Drag Race: Canada vs. the World

Drag Race Belgique

Drag Race España

Drag Race France

Drag Race Holland

Drag Race Italia

Drag Race Philippines

Drag Race Thailand

RuPaul's Drag Race Down Under

RuPaul's Drag Race UK

RuPaul's Drag Race: UK vs the World

Most frequent impersonations 
Eartha Kitt and Cardi B are the most frequently impersonated celebrities. Both queens who impersonated Mariah Carey were eliminated, making her the only choice of impersonation subject to lead to multiple contestants' eliminations. Both of the queens to impersonate Ariana Grande, Celine Dion, Ellen DeGeneres, Nancy Grace, and Rue McClanahan, respectively, two of the three queens to impersonate Lady Gaga, and two of the four queens to impersonate Cardi B were up for elimination due to their performances, but only one queen was eliminated for each. Two of the four queens to impersonate Eartha Kitt, and two of the three queens to impersonate Cher and RuPaul, respectively, landed in the bottom, but none of them were eliminated. Two of the three queens to impersonate Liza Minnelli won the Snatch Game, making her the first impersonation subject to earn multiple queens a win, while Joan Rivers became the second following season 15 of RuPaul's Drag Race.

Reception
The "Snatch Game" challenge has been called the signature challenge on the show. Kevin O'Keeffe from Into discusses that the challenge isn't only about the celebrity impersonation and RuPaul looks for accuracy, humor and the idea of the character. He also states that the challenge tests a lot of different skills, such as the queens' ability to put on a different look from their signature one, and also their ability to be "funny on a dime". RuPaul states each year, as the challenge is introduced, that the cardinal rule of the challenge is to make him laugh.

Writing for Vulture, Bowen Yang and Matt Rogers state that "Snatch Game" is "the mother of all comedy challenges on a reality show" despite the varied results over the years. On a more critical reception of the challenge, Josh Lee, for PopBuzz, argues that while the annual challenge has given viewers some of the best moments from RuPaul's Drag Race, it is starting to feel stale overall. He comments that recent celebrity impersonations in the challenge have been lackluster and the show should adapt and retire "Snatch Game" in future seasons of the series.

Notes

References

Drag Race (franchise)